Hetaeria, commonly known as hairy jewel orchids, is a genus of about thirty species of flowering plants in the orchid family Orchidaceae. Plants in this genus are terrestrial herbs with a succulent rhizome and a loose rosette of leaves. Small, pale, hairy non-resupinate flowers are borne on a thin, hairy flowering stem. They are found in tropical Africa and Asia to New Guinea, Australia and some Pacific Islands.

Description
Orchids in the genus Hetaeria are terrestrial, perennial, deciduous, sympodial herbs with a creeping, succulent, above-ground rhizome anchored to the ground by wiry roots. The leaves are dark green, usually narrow, thin-textured and arranged in a loose rosette with a short petiole-like base, the lower leaves usually withered by flowering time. The flowers are non-resupinate and usually small, dull-coloured and hairy with the dorsal sepal and petals joined to form a hood over the column. The labellum is glabrous and has a deep pouch near its base.

Taxonomy and naming
The genus Hetaeria was first formally described in 1825 by Carl Ludwig Blume and the description was published in Bijdragen tot de flora van Nederlandsch Indië. (Blume gave the name Etaeria, but Hetaeria is a conserved name.) The name Hetaeria is an Ancient Greek word meaning "comrade" or "companion".

Species list
Species recognized as of August 2018:

Hetaeria affinis (Griff.) Seidenf. & Ormerod - Himalayas, Thailand, Vietnam, Yunnan, Bangladesh
Hetaeria alta Ridl. - Thailand, Vietnam, Malaysia, Borneo 
Hetaeria anomala Lindl. - from Assam east to Taiwan and south to Sumatra and the Philippines
Hetaeria armata Ormerod & H.A.Pedersen - Thailand
Hetaeria baeuerlenii Schltr. - New Guinea
Hetaeria callosa (J.J.Sm.) Ormerod - New Guinea, Bismarcks
Hetaeria elata Hook.f. - Malaysia, Borneo, Philippines
Hetaeria elegans Ridl. - Malaysia
Hetaeria finlaysoniana Seidenf. - Sri Lanka, Myanmar, Thailand, Guangxi, Hainan 
Hetaeria gardneri (Thwaites) Benth. ex Hook.f. - Sri Lanka
Hetaeria gautierensis J.J.Sm. - New Guinea
Hetaeria goodyeroides Schltr. - New Guinea
Hetaeria heterosepala (Rchb.f.) Summerh. - Africa from Liberia to Tanzania; also Madagascar
Hetaeria hylophiloides (Carr) Ormerod & J.J.Wood - Sabah
Hetaeria lamellata Blume - Java
Hetaeria latipetala Schltr.  - New Guinea
Hetaeria linguella (Carr) J.J.Wood & Ormerod - Sarawak
Hetaeria mannii (Rchb.f.) Benth. ex Durand & Schinz - Cameroon, Gabon, Congo-Brazzaville, Congo-Kinshasa, islands in the Gulf of Guinea
Hetaeria obliqua Blume - Hainan, Nicobar Islands, Thailand, Borneo, Malaysia, Sumatra
Hetaeria oblongifolia Blume - widespread from India east to Japan and Micronesia, south to Australia
Hetaeria occidentalis Summerh. - Africa from Sierra Leone to Congo-Kinshasa
Hetaeria pelota N.Pearce & P.J.Cribb - Bhutan
Hetaeria rhombipetala Ormerod & J.J.Wood - Sabah
Hetaeria rostrata J.J.Sm. - Sumatra
Hetaeria tetraptera (Rchb.f.) Summerh. - Nigeria, Cameroon, Gabon, Congo-Kinshasa
Hetaeria vaginalis Rchb.f. - Comoros
Hetaeria whitmeei Rchb.f. - Fiji, New Caledonia, Samoa, Tonga 
Hetaeria youngsayei Ormerod - Thailand, Vietnam, Hainan

References

External links

 
Cranichideae genera